Zacosmia is a genus of digger and cuckoo bees in the family Apidae. There is one described species in Zacosmia, Z. maculata.

References

Further reading

External links

 

Apinae
Articles created by Qbugbot